Hong Su-yun (born February 9, 1987) is a  boxer from Seoul, South Korea whose foray into boxing escalated into a series of championship-fighting performances. Eventually, she developed her jabs and counter punches to become a well-rounded fighter and who opts to keep a low profile inside the ring to catch her opponents with their guard down and deploy a strong right uppercut. She became more serious about boxing in 2010, when she signed a contract with her boxing label to become a professional.

Professional career

Hong Su-yun turned professional in 2010 and compiled a record of 7-0 before facing and defeating Thai boxer Teeraporn Pannimit, to win the WBO Mini flyweight title.

Professional boxing record

References

External links

1987 births
Living people
People from Hwaseong, Gyeonggi
South Korean women boxers
Sportspeople from Gyeonggi Province
World mini-flyweight boxing champions
World light-flyweight boxing champions
World Boxing Organization champions